Bots may refer to:

 The plural form of Bot (disambiguation)

Places
 British Overseas Territories, or BOTs, territories under the jurisdiction and sovereignty of the United Kingdom

Arts, entertainment, and media
 Bots!!, a 2006 massively multiplayer online game distributed by Acclaim Games
 Bots (band), a Dutch-language folk rock group
 The Bots, American indie rock band

See also
 Big Brother's Bit on the Side (BBBOTS), a daily news/magazine show discussing the television program Big Brother
 Bott (disambiguation)
 Robot (disambiguation)